Andrés de Isasi y de Zulueta, 1st Marquess of Barambio (Barambio, Vitoria-Gasteiz, 1 December 1820 – Bilbao, 29 March 1918), of Basque descent.

Born in Barambio, Vitoria-Gasteiz, son of Pedro de Isasi y de Orúe, de Perea y de Zulueta and wife and cousin Manuela de Zulueta y de Salcedo, de Lezameta y Ugarte and a first cousin of Julián de Zulueta, 1st Marquis of Álava.

Career
He received the title of 1st Marquess of Barambio.

Marriage and children
He married on 28 November 1851 Josefa Ceferina de Murgoitio y de Urrecha, Administrator of a Majorat in Durango, of Basque descent (Durango, 25 August 1827 -), daughter of José María de Murgoitio, born in Durango, and wife Manuela de Urrecha, born in Bergüenda, and had issue, including a daughter María de Isasi y Murgoitio (Bilbao, 10 September 1854 – 1 November 1934), who married in Algorta on 5 September 1881 her second and fourth cousin Spanish Politician Ernesto de Zulueta y Samá (La Granja de San Ildefonso, 10 July 1855 – Bilbao, 2 December 1919).

References

1820 births
1918 deaths
Marquesses of Spain
People from Vitoria-Gasteiz